Mongolicosa gobiensis is a species of wolf spider only known from a single female collected in Khürmen district, Ömnögovi Province, Mongolia.

This spider, 6.8 mm in length, has a blackish-brown carapace and a dark grey, sparsely hairy  abdomen. The legs have pale banding.

References

 

Lycosidae
Spiders described in 2003
Spiders of Asia
Arthropods of Mongolia